Anne of Green Gables: The Animated Series is a Canadian animated television series produced by Sullivan Entertainment and developed by writer/director/producer Kevin Sullivan, based on the 1908 novel Anne of Green Gables by L. M. Montgomery. Many supporting characters are sourced from Sullivan's television series Road to Avonlea, which is based on Montgomery's books The Story Girl and The Golden Road. One season of the series was produced, with 26 episodes, originally airing from 2001 to 2002. The series was developed for PBS member stations and was originally distributed by PBS from 2001 to 2005, then later by American Public Television from 2010-2015. It is the second animated series based on the Anne of Green Gables story. The first one is of the same name, produced by Nippon Animation in 1979.

Each episode contained an educational aspect, with a problem for one or more of the show's characters to face and solve. In conjunction with these problems, PBS "Ready to Learn" guides were created for teachers in America to use in classrooms.

Voice cast
 Bryn McAuley as Anne Shirley, a smart and imaginative redheaded orphan girl who is adopted by the aging Cuthbert siblings. She is the main character of the series and appears in every episode of the show. In the opening sequence, Anne had a magical ability to fly.
 Wayne Robson as Matthew Cuthbert, a quiet and kind bachelor farmer who is Marilla's older brother and Anne's adoptive father.
 Patricia Gage as Marilla Cuthbert, Anne's adoptive mother. She has a strict, no-nonsense attitude but loves Anne very much. She is the second most predominant character in the series, after Anne.
 Emily Hampshire as Diana Barry, Anne's best friend, known for her jet-black hair and sunny disposition.
 Ali Mukaddam as Gilbert Blythe, Anne's friend who often competes with her academically.
 Dalene Irvine as Felicity King, a classmate of Anne and company who is jealous of her and seeks to embarrass her often. However, she and Anne are still friends (sometimes). She is based on the character of the same name from Road to Avonlea.
 Kyle Fairlie as Felix King, Felicity's younger brother and one of Anne's best friends. He is a kind, sturdy, and inventive boy. He owns a rowdy fox terrier called Caesar. He is based on the character of the same name from Road to Avonlea.
 Linda Sorensen as Hetty King, the Avonlea schoolteacher. Like Marilla, she has a no-nonsense attitude but has faith in her students. She is based on the character of the same name from Road to Avonlea.
 Anne Anglin as Peg Bowen, an eccentric woman of whom the kids are afraid until they learn she holds the answers to many of their problems. She appears in "The Stray", "Taffy", "One True Friend", "Lost and Found", "The Ice Cream Promise", "The Witch of Avonlea", "A Square Peg", and "A Condition of Superstition". She is based on the character of the same name from Road to Avonlea.
 Tracey Moore as Dryad, a wood nymph of Anne's imagination who occasionally helps Anne in solving problems.
 Patricia Hamilton as Rachel Lynde, Marilla's friend and the most gossipy woman in Avonlea. She appears in "Babysitter Blues", "Idle Chatter", "The Ice Cream Promise", "The Avonlea Herald", "A Condition of Superstition", and "A Better Mousetrap". Hamilton also portrayed Rachel in the four live-action Anne miniseries as well as Road to Avonlea.
 Unknown as Caesar, Felix's dog, who is rowdy and out of control. He likes to escape by biting away the rope that ties him down. He only appears in two episodes, "A Condition of Superstition" and "No Anne is an Island". He is a fox terrier.
 Keith Dinicol and Keith Knight as The Willows, two weeping willow trees that Anne talks to in her imagination. They seem to have different personalities, one is dramatic and stuffy, the other is grumpy and cynical. They appear in the episodes "The Stray", "Taffy", "One True Friend", "The Witch of Avonlea", and "A Condition of Superstition".
 Richard Binsley as Mr. Lawson
 Adrian Truss as Mr. Gresham
 Andrew Craig as Perry
 No Voice as the Swings, the local swing set. They have supernatural powers to see the future and tell where lost people are. They only appear in "A Condition of Superstition" because Anne and her friends asked so many questions that their powers seemed to wear off.

Episodes

Anne: Journey to Green Gables film 

In 2005, an animated "Anne of Green Gables" film was made, titled Anne: Journey to Green Gables. This 85-minute direct-to-video film was a prequel to both the live action and animated "Anne of Green Gables" series. The voice cast included Lally Cadeau, Cedric Smith, Kathryn Greenwood, and Patricia Hamilton, all of whom had appeared in previous Sullivan Entertainment productions.

In Journey to Green Gables, Anne Shirley is a clumsy yet imaginative orphan girl whose biological parents (Walter and Bertha Shirley) died when she was just a baby, she currently lives in Nova Scotia and works under the abusive servitude of the Hammond family, who have eight children including three sets of twins: all of whom she is forced to take care of. While living with the Hammonds, Anne is bullied by her foster siblings and is constantly mistreated and degraded by her foster parents, until one day they have her sent away to the dreary Grout Orphanage, operated by the aristocratic and magisterial director Madame Poubelle. During her time at the orphanage, Anne along with the other children are subjected into slavery and deprived of having toys, nice clothes, and full course meals; she later has most of her books confiscated by Poubelle who throws them in the fireplace to be burned, except for her favorite book-(entitled "The Rich & Famous Lives of French Nobility") that was saved by Mavis, an orphanage assistant who shows sympathy and compassion towards Anne and the children while she works and suffers under Poubelle's cruel authority.

A while later, Anne arrives in the fictional town of Avonlea in Prince Edward Island and is mistakably taken to live on the pastoral home of the aging Marilla Cuthbert and her older brother Matthew, who were expecting a little boy named Charlie-(who was instead sent to the Hammond family as Anne's replacement). Despite the mix-up, Marilla reluctantly takes in Anne into her care, but as Anne becomes a big help with the house and the farm, Marilla's outlook on Anne begins to change on a positive note and becomes more of a mother figure to her. Meanwhile, when Madame Poubelle recalls Anne's factual claims of being the sole heir of the LaRoue family inheritance and their heirloom, she becomes determined to get Anne back into the orphanage, in order to reclaim her own lost inheritance that was gambled away.

Funding
 Barbie.com (Mattel's website)
 Viewers Like You (with "Thank You")

References

External links

 Official website
 
 

Anne of Green Gables television series
TVO original programming
PBS original programming
2000s Canadian animated television series
2000s Canadian comedy-drama television series
2001 Canadian television series debuts
2002 Canadian television series endings
Films directed by Kevin Sullivan
Canadian television shows based on children's books
PBS Kids shows
Canadian children's animated adventure television series
Canadian children's animated comedy television series
Canadian children's animated drama television series
Canadian children's animated education television series
Canadian children's animated fantasy television series
English-language television shows
Animated television series about orphans
Canadian television series with live action and animation
Television series by DHX Media
Television shows set in Prince Edward Island